The Ukhrul district of Manipur state in India is divided into 4 sub-districts called blocks. At the time of the 2011 Census of India, the Kamjong district (created in 2016) was a part of the Ukhrul district.

Blocks 

The Ukhrul district is divided into four blocks: Ukhrul, Jessami, Chingai, and Lungchong Maiphei.

At the time of the 2011 census, Ukhrul was divided into following subdivisions: Ukhrul North, Ukhrul Central, Kamjong-Chassad, Phungyar-Phaisat, and Ukhrul South.

Towns

Villages

Ukhrul block 

The Ukhrul block includes the following villages:

Jessami block 

The Jessami block includes the following villages:

Chingai block 

The Chingai block includes the following villages:

The following villages are not listed in the 2011 census directory: Longpi Kajui, Luireishimphung, Ngahui, Paorei, and Varangalai.

Lungchong Maiphei block 

The Lungchong Maiphei block includes the following villages:

The following villages are not listed in the 2011 census directory: Maichon and Ngainga.

References 

Ukhrul